Jeremy Beale and Calum Puttergill won the title after defeating Rio Noguchi and Yusuke Takahashi 7–6(7–2), 6–4 in the final.

Harri Heliövaara and Patrik Niklas-Salminen were the defending champions but chose not to defend their title.

Seeds

Draw

References

External links
 Main draw

City of Playford Tennis International - Men's doubles